is a Japanese original video animation (OVA) hentai series produced by Natural High. Described as "the world's first shotacon anime" by its producer, it was primarily marketed to a male audience. The series consists of three episodes and a version of the first episode edited for content, and later spawned a one-shot manga, a computer game, and a music video album.

Characters
All character design was done by Saigado.

Pico
 

A blonde-haired boy who works a summer part-time job at his grandfather's bar. He is often portrayed swimming, usually naked or in a blue Speedo. He has worn girls' clothes ever since Tamotsu (Mokkun) gave some to him as a gift. Later, feeling hurt that Tamotsu wouldn't define their relationship, he rebels by cutting his hair and running away from home, although later on they reconcile. The following summer, Pico meets Chico, who is swimming naked in a stream, while riding his bike. He soon becomes friends with Chico, who calls him "Oniichan" (big brother), and they form a romantic and sexual relationship. In his relationships with both Mokkun and Chico, he is the uke, though in the latter relationship this is somewhat reversible.
Tamotsu
, also known as Mokkun, is a white-collar worker and regular at Bebe. He seduces Pico after mistaking him for a young girl, but continues the relationship after discovering Pico is in fact male. He later buys Pico a girl's outfit/Locker room, complete with a ruby choker and panties, which he persuades Pico to wear despite his initial protests. He views Pico solely as a sexual object, though later shows true concern for Pico after he disappears. Although he eventually reconciles with Pico, he is absent in the second and third OVAs. In his relationship with Pico, he is the seme.
Ojiisan
 is Pico's grandfather who runs a large but usually empty bar by the beach named Bebe. When Tamotsu visits him for the summer, he has Pico help out as waiter, which involves wearing a frilly pink apron. He introduces Pico to Tamotsu and suggests they spend time together.
Chico
 

A brunette boy who lives with his older sister in a large house in a secluded forest area and develops a sexual relationship with Pico in the second episode. He is younger and less sexually experienced than Pico. He often plays in the outdoors nude and secretly watches Oneesan masturbate. In most cases, Chico is the seme, despite his age, though his relationship with Pico is somewhat reversible.
Oneesan
Oneesan (お姉さん) is Chico's older sister and legal guardian. Perhaps because of her caring for Chico, and her isolated home in the countryside, she appears sexually frustrated and masturbates regularly. After being caught masturbating by the boys through a crack in her bedroom ceiling, she becomes the indirect cause of their experimentation. She has a large collection of cosplay outfits and sex toys that Pico and Chico use without her permission. She later fondles herself away from the boys when she finds them sexually engaged upon returning home from the grocery store.
CoCo
 is a feminine-looking boy with long, black hair whom Pico and Chico meet in the third episode. It is subtly implied that Coco is actually a so-called "city fairy", due to some strange minor occurrences in his vicinity, though this is never explicitly confirmed. Coco soon has sexual relationships with both Pico and Chico. After inadvertently causing some friction in their relationship, Coco decides to distance himself from Pico and Chico, though they do reunite with him at Tokyo Tower and end up having a threesome. He is also the main uke of the three, but this can be reversed.

Media

Original video animations
Three original video animations have been released. All three were directed by Katsuyoshi Yatabe and produced by Natural High. The first, My Pico, was released to DVD by Soft on Demand on September 7, 2006. The second, Pico & Chico, followed on April 16, 2007. The third episode, Pico & CoCo & Chico, was released on October 9, 2008.

A box set containing the first two episodes and the soundtrack CD was released by Soft on Demand on April 19, 2007. On November 11, 2007, the first OVA was re-edited with a different script and re-released under the title Pico: My Little Summer Story. The edited version is the only one of the series to be considered appropriate for viewers under 18.

Manga
A oneshot manga, was written by Aoi Madoka and published in the May 2007 issue of Hanaota.

Visual novel
On April 6, 2008, the producer's blog confirmed that a PC game, starring Pico and Chico, was being produced.

Music video album
A music video album, was released in Japan on July 9, 2009. It runs for 30 minutes and includes more than 8 music videos starring the characters from the OVAs. It also includes a karaoke option for each video.

References

External links
 Official site 
 

2006 anime OVAs
2007 anime OVAs
2008 anime OVAs
Anime with original screenplays
Hentai anime and manga
Internet memes
Cross-dressing in anime and manga
Film and television memes
Works about pedophilia